Ulla-Maija "Uma" Aaltonen (28 August 1940, Vihti – 13 July 2009, Helsinki) was a Finnish author, journalist, and Green League politician.

Early life and education 
Aaltonen was raised on a farm and learned to love animals at a very young age. She studied journalism, sociology and psychology at the University of Tampere.

As a journalist, she was particularly interested in issues of cruelty towards children and animals. She later owned her own farm. Aaltonen spent many years advocating for a statue in Seinajoki celebrating war horses. The monument was unveiled in 1996.

Aaltonen was diagnosed with multiple sclerosis in 1993.

Career 
Aaltonen worked as a journalist at YLE and contributed to Anna magazine. She wrote a number of books for young people about sex education and animal cruelty.

In 1994 she served as manager for Elisabeth Rehn’s presidential campaign.

Aaltonen served in the European Parliament between 2003 and 2004 representing the Greens-EFA party, after fellow Green Party politician Heidi Hautala returned to the Finnish Parliament. During her term, Aaltonen was an outspoken advocate for European patients with MS. In December 2003 she addressed the European Parliament about concerns regarding discrimination against people with MS in the European Union.

In the fall of 2008 of Aaltonen was elected to Vihti Municipal Council.

Death 
Aaltonen complained of pain in early July 2009 and was admitted to Töölö Hospital in Helsinki. She died suddenly on July 13, 2009 and is buried at the Hietaniemi Cemetery in Helsinki.

External links
Uma Aaltonen's profile on the European Parliament's public information website

References

1940 births
2009 deaths
21st-century Finnish journalists
People from Vihti
Green League MEPs
MEPs for Finland 1999–2004
20th-century women MEPs for Finland
21st-century women MEPs for Finland
Finnish women journalists
University of Tampere alumni
20th-century Finnish journalists